Rhyze was an American R&B and funk band. They are probably best known for their song "Just How Sweet Is Your Love" which was an R&B and dance hit. Much of their output was material written by Paul Kyser and Leon Stuckey.

Background

Nu-Sound Express
The group's history can be traced back to an act called Soul Unlimited. They were still at college when they met and became associated with a young Paul Kyser who was a record producer, song writer and arranger. He changed their name to The Nu-Sound Express, LTD. / Nu-Sound Express. They released 2 singles and had a degree of success playing the New York, New Jersey and Pennsylvania music venues. Later they changed their name to Rhyze.

Rhyze
The group consisted of Roscoe Taylor (lead vocals, trumpet), Elisworth "EI-T" Anderson (bass, lead vocals), Vince Jackson (guitar, lead vocals), Charles Holmes (drums), Joseph "Jo Jo" McKnight (congas, percussion), Kevin Barbee (keyboards), Richard Menter (trumpet) and Kenneth Hicks (sax). Rhyze was nominated for Grammy Award for Best R&B Performance by a Duo or Group with Vocals in 1981. The band split up around the same year.

"Just How Sweet Is Your Love" which entered two Billboard charts in 1980.
It reached number 16 on Hot Dance/Disco chart and number 92 on Black Singles chart.

In 2011, their devotional album God Is On Call was released.

The band was mostly influenced by jazz, funk, disco and soul.

Band members
Roscoe Taylor – lead vocals, trumpet
Ellsworth 'EI-T' Anderson – bass, lead vocals
Vince Jackson – guitar, lead vocals
Charles Holmes – drums
Joseph "Jo Jo" McKnight – congas, percussion
Kevin Barbee – keyboards
Richard Menter – trumpet
Kenneth Hicks – sax

Awards
Rhyze's album Rhyze to the Top was nominated for "Grammy Award for Best R&B Performance by a Duo or Group with Vocals" but lost to Quincy Jones's The Dude.
Rhyze was nominated for "Grammy Award for Best New Artist" but lost to Sheena Easton.

Discography

Albums

Studio albums

Singles

1 A-side only charted.

References

Musical groups established in 1980
Musical groups disestablished in 1981
American contemporary R&B musical groups
American funk musical groups
SAM Records artists